Verkh-Yazva is a rural locality (a selo) and the administrative center of Verkh-Yazvinskoye Rural Settlement, Krasnovishersky District, Perm Krai, Russia. The population was 868 as of 2010. There are 18 streets.

Geography 
Verkh-Yazva is located 47 km southeast of Krasnovishersk (the district's administrative centre) by road. Grishina is the nearest rural locality.

References 

Rural localities in Krasnovishersky District